Hays may refer to:

People 
 Hays (surname)

Places

United States
 Hays (Pittsburgh), a neighborhood in Pittsburgh, Pennsylvania
 Hays, Kansas
 Fort Hays
 Hays Regional Airport
 Hays, Kentucky, an unincorporated community in Warren County
 Hays, Montana
 Hays, North Carolina
 Hays, Texas
 Hays County, Texas

Elsewhere
 Hays, Alberta, Canada
 Hays Reef, Tasmania, Australia

Schools 
 Charles Hays Secondary School in Prince Rupert, British Columbia
 Fort Hays State University in Hays, Kansas
 Walter Hays School in Palo Alto, California

Other uses
 Hay's Galleria, a shopping mall and tourist attraction in London
 Hays Code, a set of motion picture industry guidelines
 Hays plc, a British recruitment company 
 Hays Travel, a travel agency chain based in Sunderland, England

See also 
 Hayes (disambiguation)
 Hay (disambiguation)
 Justice Hays (disambiguation)

ja:HAYS